The Atlantic pomfret (Brama brama), also known as Ray's bream, is a species of marine ray-finned fish, a pomfret of the family Bramidae.

In South Africa, where it is a common bycatch of the hake fishery, it is generally known and sold as "angelfish", although it is not a true marine angelfish.

The Atlantic pomfret has very significant migration patterns which greatly depend on the temperature of intermediate waters, but are also affected by secondary reactions from density dependence and the climatic conditions of the surface. Although the species was first recorded in Irish waters in 1843, it was still regarded as scarce up until the late 1950s, but between the 1960s and 1970s large numbers were recorded. The population has been booming since the late 2000s.

References

External links
 
 

Fish of the Atlantic Ocean
Atlantic pomfret
Fish described in 1788
Taxa named by Pierre Joseph Bonnaterre